The following is a list of Flags used in Guyana.

National Flag

Presidential Flags

Military Flags

Subdivision Flags

Proposed Flag

Historical Flags

Spanish Rule

Dutch Rule

French Rule

Under Great Colombia

Under Venezuela

British Rule

See also 

 Flag of Guyana
 Coat of arms of Guyana

References 

Lists and galleries of flags
Flags